The Plym Valley Railway is a  heritage railway based on part of the now-closed South Devon and Tavistock Railway, a branch line of the Great Western Railway in Devon, England.

History 

The line was originally part of the South Devon and Tavistock Railway, a  broad gauge railway linking Plymouth with Tavistock in Devon, England.

Local enthusiasts set up a group in 1982 to restore part of the line as the Plym Valley Railway. A new station was constructed just north of the site of the original Marsh Mills railway station as that site is occupied by a line that serves the Marsh Mills china clay plant. The new station was provided with a shop, buffet and small museum.

The 0-4-0ST steam locomotive "Albert" returned to service in December 2007 after receiving major repairs to its boiler. Albert has operated on all passenger trains and diesel No. 13002 has been used regularly on engineering trains. In 2009 preparation work commenced on returning 0-6-0ST "Byfield" to steam, seeing the locomotive stripped down to its main components for assessment.

Location

Rolling stock

Steam locomotives

Diesel locomotives

Diesel multiple units

Former Plym Valley Railway locomotives

External links

References

Heritage railways in Devon
Standard gauge railways in England